The Eggstock (3,554 m), is a minor prominence of the Uri Alps, forming the northern pillar of the Dammastock on the border between the cantons of Valais and Uri. The tripoint between the cantons of Bern, Valais and Uri (3,500 m) is located 600 m west of the summit.

References

External links
 Eggstock on Hikr

Mountains of the Alps
Alpine three-thousanders
Mountains of Switzerland
Mountains of the canton of Bern
Mountains of Valais
Mountains of the canton of Uri
Bern–Uri border
Bern–Valais border
Uri–Valais border